Benu Gopal Bangur (born 1931) is an Indian billionaire businessman, and the chairman of Shree Cement.

Early life
Bangur was born in a 1931 in a Marwari business family. Bangur was educated at Calcutta University.

Career
His grandfather, Mungee Ram Bangur, a Calcutta stockbroker, and his brother Ram Coowar Bangur, started the Bangur business empire in the late 19th century. In 1991, the business was split into five groups, between Balbhadra Das Bangur, Niwas Bangur, Kumar Bangur and Benu Gopal Bangur (all grandsons of Mungee Ram) and Laxmi Niwas Bangur (grandson of Ram Coowar).

According to Forbes, Bangur has a net worth of $6.0 billion, as of October 2019. In 2020, he ranked 14th in Forbes' Indian billionaire list with a net worth of $7.3 billion.

Personal life
Bangur is widowed with two children and lives in Kolkata. His son, Hari Mohan Bangur, has been running Shree Cement since 1990.

References 

1931 births
Living people
Businesspeople from Kolkata
Indian billionaires